The Signal Mountain murders refers to a widely publicized case in 1988 involving the shootings of Richard Mason, Kenneth Griffith, and Earl Smock near Chattanooga, Tennessee.

Missing men
The men were missing and being searched for by their relatives when they did not return home. These relatives followed a bloodied path to the bodies off Big Fork Road and later found the victims' All-terrain vehicles (ATVs) in a separate location. Their bullet ridden bodies and ATVs were found in the woods of Signal Mountain near Roberts Mill Road. The three men had been riding along trails, portions of which crossed private property, with the intention of going swimming.

Suspect
The owners of the land were Frank Casteel and his wife, Susie. When Frank noticed more and more people intruding on his land he consulted a police officer who advised him to keep a logbook of everyone he witnessed.  Frank had a run in with the three men and wrote it down, though never mentioned anything of murder. The men were later found dead and Casteel was a prime suspect. At the time Frank had a mistress, Mrs. Marie Hill, to whom Casteel’s wife sent his logbook in hopes that Mrs. Hill would leave him. Mrs. Hill turned in the logbook to the police for evidence.

Conviction
Although there was no mention of violent behavior in the book and no physical evidence to support Casteel’s conviction, he was sentenced to life in prison. An appeal was made and eventually given an opportunity to overturn Casteel’s conviction in 2001. The attorneys said there was no hard evidence that clearly identifies Casteel as the murderer. In 2003 Frank Casteel was found guilty again for the triple homicide and returned to prison.

Death
Casteel died in prison in May 2019 at the age of 71.

In 2020, Casteel's son Franklin Trever Casteel authored a book on the subject.

Media depictions
Unsolved Mysteries aired a segment regarding the murders in season 2 episode 13 which aired on January 3, 1990.
A&E (TV channel) covered the murders in season 4, episode 9, of their City Confidential series. The title of the episode was "Dangerous Trespassing".
Investigation Discovery portrayed the murders in the show "Bloodlands" on August 18, 2014.  This was season 1 episode 3 titled "Signal Mountain Murders".

References

Murder in Tennessee
1988 murders in the United States
Crimes in Tennessee
1988 in Tennessee